Vincenzo Ricotta (born 14 October 1959), professionally known as Vincent Riotta, is a British actor.

Career
Riotta studied at the Royal Academy of Dramatic Art. He went on to perform in various stage plays, such as Shakespeare's Romeo, which was held at the Young Vic, Tennessee Williams' A Streetcar Named Desire, held at the Leicester Haymarket. Also, the twin roles of The Corsican Brothers at the Abbey in Dublin, and the lead role of Fridays at Seven at the Court Theatre in West Hollywood.

His more notable television appearances include UK soap Coronation Street, The Bill (1990, series 6 episode 52 Close to Home) for Thames Television, New Tricks (2013, series 10 episode Rock the Boat parts one & two) for the BBC, JAG for NBC, Monk for USA Network, and Alias for ABC. In 2016 Riotta appeared in British mystery series Endeavor. 

Riotta's film credits include the independent mafia film Al Capone, for which he won the Best Actor award at the 1995 Barcelona Film Festival for his portrayal of the title character. In 2002, he played the lead role of Rico Morales in the drama Bella Bettien. He also holds many cameo appearances to his name in such high-profile films as Captain Corelli's Mandolin, starring Nicolas Cage and Penélope Cruz. However, universally he is probably best recognised as one of the lead male roles in the 2003 romantic-comedy Under The Tuscan Sun, starring Diane Lane and fellow Italian actor Raoul Bova. In the film, he plays Frances Mayes' (Diane Lane) first love interest upon arriving in Italy; a kind, well-reserved and married estate agent from whom she receives emotional support throughout the film. To the contrary, on the commentary of Under the Tuscan Sun, director Audrey Wells states that his character's persona was merely something he invented, as in reality he is boyishly energetic.

Personal life
Riotta was born in Britain to Italian immigrants. He is fluent in Sicilian. 
He is married to casting director Teresa Razzauti. They live in London with their daughter, Emma Riotta.

Selected filmography
 1985 A.D. Anno Domini - The Trials and Triumphs of the Early Church (TV Mini-Series) as Saint Stephen
 1985 Car Trouble as Kevin (as Vincenzo Ricotta)
 1987 Body Contact as Tony Zulu (as Vincenzo Ricotta)
 1988 Hanna's War as Yoel (as Vincenzo Ricotta)
 1993 Leon the Pig Farmer as Elliot Cohen (as Vincenzo Ricotta)
 1994 Il Quinto giorno as Robert (as Vincenzo Ricotta)
 1994 La Chance as Nicola (as Vincenzo Ricotta)
 1994 Ready to Kill as Robert (as Vincenzo Ricotta)
 1995 A Little Worm (Short) as Al Capone
 1996 In Love and War as Italian Officer (as Vincenzo Ricotta)
 1998 Matter of Trust as Johnny (as Vincenzo Ricotta)
 1998 Falling Sky as Mr. Hanes (as Vince Ricotta)
 1999 Ballad of the Nightingale as Michael Wynn-Booth (as Vincenzo Ricotta)
 2000 The Hook-Armed Man (Short) as Lou (as Vincenzo Ricotta)
 2000 Dancing at the Blue Iguana as Customer (as Vincent Ricotta)
 2001 Captain Corelli's Mandolin as Quartermaster (as Vincenzo Ricotta)
 2002 The Good War as Italian POW
 2002 Heaven as Chief Guard
 2002 Bella Bettien as Rico Morales
 2003 Under the Tuscan Sun as Martini
 2003 Belly of the Beast as Fitch McQuad
 2004 Nema problema as Anselmo Lorenzi
 2004 Nel mio amore as Jacques
 2004 Unstoppable as Detective Jay Miller
 2005 Revolver as Benny
 2006 The Listening as Vaughan
 2007 Nuclear Secrets (TV Mini-Series) as Brugioni
 2007 The Moon and the Stars as Tumiati
 2007 Il Capo dei Capi (TV Mini-Series) as Tommaso Buscetta
 2008 The Dark Knight as Cop At 250 52nd St.
 2008 Einstein (TV Movie) as The NASA Operator
 2009 Butterfly zone - Il senso della farfalla as Uomo (aldilà)
 2009 Nine as Luigi
 2009-2012 Squadra antimafia – Palermo oggi (TV Series) as Mickey Robson
 2011 Zen (TV Mini-Series) as Giorgio de Angelis
 2011 Hustle Series 7 (TV Series) as Carle Bachini
 2012 Goltzius and the Pelican Company as Ricardo del Monte
 2013 Rush as Lauda's Mechanic
 2013 Third Person as Gerry
 2013-2014 Da Vinci's Demons (TV Series) as Federico da Montefeltro, Duke of Urbino
 2014 Romeo and Juliet (TV Series) as Capulet
 2014 Tender Eyes as Henry
 2016 Inferno as Death Mask Guard
 2016 In guerra per amore as USA Army Major James Maone
 2016 Natale a Londra – Dio salvi la regina as Mike "The Hammer"
 2017 Black Butterfly as Lieutenant Carcano
 2017 The Chinese Widow as James Doolittle
 2017 An American Exorcism as Father Ryan Stone
 2017 55 Steps as James Adams
 2018 Entebbe as Dan Shomron
 2019 Dolce Fine Giornata as Lodovici
 2019 The Two Popes as Driver
 2019 Entro Mezzanotte as Prison Guard
 2020 Divorzio a Las Vegas as Judge Pistons
 2022 Rocketry: The Nambi Effect as Luigi Crocco

References

External links

1960 births
Living people
20th-century English male actors
21st-century English male actors
English male film actors
English male stage actors
English male television actors
English people of Italian descent
Male actors from Hertfordshire
People from Hertford